The Literary and Philosophical Society of Newcastle upon Tyne (or the Lit & Phil as it is popularly known) is a historical library in Newcastle upon Tyne, England, and the largest independent library outside London. The library is still available for both lending (to members) and as a free reference library. The society is a registered charity.

Founding
Founded in 1793 as a "conversation club" by the Reverend William Turner and others – more than fifty years before the London Library – the annual subscription was originally one guinea. The Lit and Phil library contained works in French, Spanish, German and Latin; its contacts were international, and its members debated a wide range of issues, but religion and politics were prohibited.  Women were first admitted to the library in 1804.
In February 2011, actor and comedian Alexander Armstrong became President of the Lit & Phil. He launched their funding appeal at a special gala event.
At the start of 2012, membership of the Library reached 2,000, the highest number since 1952.

History

During the 19th and 20th centuries, the Lit & Phil was host to a long list of the intelligentsia of the era. Engineer and inventor George Stephenson showed his miner's lamp there, and in 1879, when Joseph Swan demonstrated his electric light bulbs, the Lit and Phil building became the first public building to be so illuminated.

The Society received in 1800 the country's first specimens of the wombat and the duck-billed platypus from John Hunter, Governor of New South Wales and honorary member of the Lit and Phil.

Between 1822 and 1825, a new building was created for the Society on Westgate Road, designed by John Green. The building is still in use today, with many original features including iron-work second-floor galleries.

Presidents

Notable members
Amongst the historic and contemporary members are the following:

References

Sources
Association of Independent Libraries
The National Archives

External links

Society website

Regional and local learned societies of the United Kingdom
Buildings and structures in Newcastle upon Tyne
Culture in Newcastle upon Tyne
Philosophical societies in the United Kingdom
1793 establishments in England
Organizations established in 1793
John and Benjamin Green buildings and structures
Charities based in Tyne and Wear